The Frank G. Edwards House is a historic residential building built in 1883, and located at 1366 Guerrero Street in the Noe Valley section of San Francisco, California.

The Frank G. Edwards House is listed on the National Register of Historic Places since September 30, 1982; listed as a California Historical Landmark since October 29, 1982; and listed as a San Francisco Designated Landmark since December 17, 1988.

History 
It was built in 1883 and designed by local architect Joseph Gosling. The house is flat front Italianate in style, and reflects the emergence of the popular Stick-style with its flattened features.

Edwards (1822—1900) was English-born an importer, publisher, and civic leader; and had worked in the carpet and wallpaper business with his business "Pioneer Carpet House". He was a member of the Vigilance Committee and the San Francisco Fire Department.

See also
National Register of Historic Places listings in San Francisco

References

External links 

 Frank G. Edwards papers, 1858-1906., California State Library

National Register of Historic Places in San Francisco
San Francisco Designated Landmarks
1880s architecture in the United States
Italianate architecture in California
California Historical Landmarks
Houses on the National Register of Historic Places in San Francisco